is a passenger railway station located in the city of Hadano, Kanagawa Prefecture, Japan.  The station operated by the private railway operator Odakyu Electric Railway. As its name (literally "in front of Tokai University") implies, the station is located close to the Shōnan campus of Tokai University.

Lines
Tōkaidaigaku-mae Station is served by the Odakyu Odawara Line. It is located 57.0 rail km from the line's Tokyo terminal at Shinjuku Station.

Station layout
The station has two opposed side platforms serving two tracks, with the station building is constructed on a cantilever above the platforms and tracks.

Platforms

History
It was given its present name on 9 March 1987, and the current station building was completed the same year.

Station numbering was introduced in January 2014 with Tōkaidaigaku-mae being assigned station number OH38.

Passenger statistics
In fiscal 2019, the station was used by an average of 38,909 passengers daily.

The passenger figures for previous years are as shown below.

Surrounding area
 Tōkai University Shōnan Campus
 Ōne Elementary School
 Hirohata Elementary School
 Ōne Junior High School
Kanagawa Prefectural Hadano High School

See also
List of railway stations in Japan

References

External links

  

Railway stations in Japan opened in 1927
Odakyu Odawara Line
Railway stations in Kanagawa Prefecture
Hadano, Kanagawa